Maki Station is the name of three train stations in Japan:

 Maki Station (Niigata) (巻駅)
 Maki Station (Kyoto) (牧駅)
 Maki Station (Oita) (牧駅)